Alex Díaz de la Portilla (born August 25, 1964) is a Cuban-American politician from Florida.  As of November 2019, Díaz de la Portilla serves as a  City of Miami Commissioner for District 1, which includes the predominantly Hispanic areas of Flagami, Allapattah, and parts of Little Havana. A Republican, he was a member of the Florida Senate from 2000 to 2010, representing parts of Miami-Dade County. Previously, he served in the Florida House of Representatives from 1994 until his election to the Senate.

Early life and career 
Díaz de la Portilla was born and raised in the Little Havana community of Miami. His career in politics began in 1990, when he ran for the Florida House of Representatives. He lost the Republican primary, and lost again to Carlos Manrique when he ran for another House seat in 1992. Two years later, he challenged Manrique, and was successful.

Díaz de la Portilla served in the Florida House from 1994 until 2000, when he was elected to the Florida Senate in a special election. He was reelected to the Senate three times. He served as president pro tempore from 2002 to 2004.

Later political career
Díaz de la Portilla ran for the Florida House of Representatives in the 112th district in 2012, but lost to Democrat José Javier Rodríguez, 53.7 to 46.3%.

In 2017, Díaz de la Portilla ran in a special election for a Florida Senate seat left vacant when Senator Frank Artiles resigned. He lost the Republican primary to Jose Felix Diaz, who lost to Democrat Annette Taddeo in the general election.

Díaz de la Portilla was a candidate for a May 2018 special election for the Miami-Dade County Commission. The Miami Herald endorsed him. No candidate secured more than 50% of the vote and the runoff that followed saw Eileen Higgins become the new County Commissioner of District 5.

In 2019, Diaz de la Portilla was one of seven candidates running to represent Miami’s District 1. The seat was being vacated by Commissioner Wifredo “Willy” Gort, who was term-limited.

On election day, Diaz de la Portilla netted 39 percent of the votes, followed by former Miami Planning and Zoning Board Member Miguel Angel Gabela with 21 percent support. The former state senator won a runoff election with 60% of the votes, beating Miguel Angel Gabela.

Since then, Commissioner Alex Díaz de la Portilla has been serving as the City of Miami Commissioner for District One, representing Flagami, Allapattah, and parts of Little Havana. As a City Commissioner, Diaz de la Portilla has championed an improved quality of life for the residents of District One through investments in infrastructure, parks, and cleanliness. Diaz de la Portilla has also been a strong advocate for more employment opportunities and a steady recovery from the effects of the Coronavirus pandemic.

Family
Díaz is one of the four children of Cuban exiles Miguel Ángel Díaz Pardo and Fabiola Pura de la Portilla García. His paternal great-grandfather served in Cuban Senate, while two of his sons served simultaneously in the Cuban House of Representatives. His maternal great-grandfather served as Cuban Minister of Justice.

His brothers have also held elected office: 
Miguel Díaz de la Portilla served as a member of the Miami-Dade County Commission from 1993 to 2000 and succeeded Alex in the Florida Senate, serving from 2010 to 2016.
Renier Díaz de la Portilla served two stints on the Miami-Dade County School Board (1996–1998 and 2006–2012). He also succeeded Alex in the House of Representatives, serving one term from 2000 to 2002.

Electoral history

Florida House of Representatives, 1990-1998

Florida Senate, 1999-2006

Post-Senate electoral career

References

External links
 Florida Senate - Alex Díaz de la Portilla

|-

|-

|-

|-

1964 births
Hispanic and Latino American state legislators in Florida
Living people
American politicians of Cuban descent
Republican Party members of the Florida House of Representatives
Republican Party Florida state senators